Tritonia callogorgiae is a species of dendronotid nudibranch. It is a marine gastropod mollusc in the family Tritoniidae.

Distribution
This species is found in the Southern Adriatic Sea, Mediterranean Sea, 30 nautical miles SW of Bar, Montenegro, at 420–426 m depth, .

References

Tritoniidae
Gastropods described in 2020